Seyjan (also Romanized as Seyjān; also known as Sīchān) is a village in Khosrow Beyk Rural District, Milajerd District, Komijan County, Markazi Province, Iran. At the 2006 census, its population was 208, in 56 families.

References 

Populated places in Komijan County